{{Infobox song
| name     = Mercy Street
| cover    =
| alt      =
| artist   = Peter Gabriel
| album    = So
| released = October 1986
| recorded =
| studio   = 
| genre    = 
| length   = 
| label    = Geffen
| writer   = Peter Gabriel
| producer = 
Daniel Lanois
Peter Gabriel
| tracks   =  {{Hidden
 | title        = 9 tracks
 | text         = 
Side one
 "Red Rain"
 "Sledgehammer"
 "Don't Give Up"
 "That Voice Again"
Side two
 "In Your Eyes"
 "Mercy Street"
 "Big Time"
 "We Do What We're Told"
 "This Is the Picture (Excellent Birds)"
 }}
}}

"Mercy Street" is a song written by English musician Peter Gabriel from his 1986 album So.

Background and recording
The song was inspired by the personal and confessional works of the American poet Anne Sexton, who wrote a play titled Mercy Street and a poem titled "45 Mercy Street".  It features two harmonious Gabriel vocals; one a shadow vocal an octave below the main vocal. Intended to give a sensual, haunting effect, he could only capture this effect upon waking up. 

The song is based around the Forró drum rhythm, which Gabriel recorded in Brazil. Originally the rhythm was used in an early incarnation of the song, titled "Don’t Break This Rhythm" (later released as a B-side to Sledgehammer), but he became dissatisfied with it. He then changed the song to include an English folk melody and strapped on lyrics based on Anne Sexton’s work. Piano playing by Richard Tee was added to the song, but Gabriel felt it made the song too complex arrangement-wise, so it was removed from the final mix (although his contributions were credited).

A video was created for "Mercy Street", though the song was not released as a single.

Reception
NME listed the song as one of the "10 Most Depressing Songs Ever", describing it as a "beautifully produced number" featuring Gabriel's "usual sensitivity". They concluded "it isn't until you're a few listens in that you understand how devastating the whole thing is."

Personnel
Djalma Correa – surdo, congas, triangle
Larry Klein – bass guitar
Richard Tee – piano
Mark Rivera – processed saxophone
Peter Gabriel – vocals, CMI, Prophet, piano, CS-80

Release details and cover versions
As well as appearing on side two of So, "Mercy Street" was released (remixed by William Orbit) on Gabriel's 1992 CD-single "Blood of Eden". It was also reinterpreted by Gabriel on his 2011 orchestral album New Blood.

The song was covered by many artists including:

Grammy award winning Jamaican reggae band Black Uhuru on their 1993 release Mystical Truth.

Herbie Hancock on his 1996 album The New Standard.

Miriam Stockley on her 1999 album Miriam.

Christy Baron on her 2000 Chesky release, Steppin' .

Solveig Slettahjell on her 2005 album (with Knut Reiersrud and In the Country), Trail of Souls.

Richard Shindell on his 2007 album of covers South of Delia.

Fever Ray released this song as a single August 2010. 

Elbow have also released a version of the song on the album And I'll Scratch Yours. The studio album features Peter Gabriel songs from artists he covered on the companion album Scratch My Back.

References

External links 
 Anne Sexton's poems at Poetry Foundation

Peter Gabriel songs
Songs written by Peter Gabriel
Song recordings produced by Daniel Lanois
1986 songs